Louise Amélie Landré (31 January 1852 – 6 February 1934) was a French painter. She studied under Jean Hubert and Charles Chaplin and made her debut at the Salon in 1876. In 1885, she became a member of the Société des Artistes Français. Three of her 1916 watercolors showing the lives of soldiers are in the collection of the Metropolitan Museum of Art.

Her work was part of the painting event in the art competition at the 1924 Summer Olympics.

References

1852 births
1934 deaths
19th-century French painters
20th-century French painters
French women painters
Olympic competitors in art competitions
Painters from Paris
20th-century French women